Mamry is a lake in the Masurian Lake District of Poland's Warmia-Mazury Province. It is the second largest lake in Poland, with an area of 104 km2. The lake's maximum depth is 44 m with an average depth of 11 m.

It actually comprises six connected lakes: Mamry, Kirsajty, Kisajno, Dargin, Święcajty and Dobskie. Mamry features 33 islands, totaling 213 hectares, some of which are ornithological reserves.

Lake Mamry is a popular tourist destination. It is connected to the Pregolya and the Baltic Sea by the disused Masurian Canal. The largest town on the lake shore is Giżycko.

The lake bottom is diversified, with numerous depressions and shallows, while the northern part is considerably deeper, and the bottom is overgrown with raised vegetation and underwater meadows with horsetails. The shores of the lake are mostly low and marshy, partly overgrown with forest.

History 
In the past, the lakes of the Mamry complex formed separate bodies of water connected by streams. The water level in the lakes rose in the 16th–17th centuries by several meters. The following factors contributed to the rise of the water level in the Mamry complex: the dam on the Węgorapa River (the mill), movements of the earth crust - post-glacial rebound in the northern part of the complex by 1 mm a year. The former road to the church from Kal to Węgielsztyn, some Masurian settlements and cemeteries were under water.

References 

Lakes of Warmian-Masurian Voivodeship
Węgorzewo County